The Cementerio de Nuestra Señora de La Almudena, former Necrópolis del Este (East cemetery) is a cemetery in Madrid, Spain. It is the largest in Madrid and one of the largest in Western Europe. The number of people buried is estimated to be about five million, larger than the population of Madrid itself, since it was the main cemetery for the entire city from 1884 to 1973, and from the 1920s was almost the only one for the majority of the population of Madrid.

Notable burials
 Alfredo Di Stéfano (1926–2014), Real Madrid player
 Niceto Alcalá-Zamora (1877–1949), president of the Second Spanish Republic
 Vicente Aleixandre (1898–1984), poet, Nobel laureate
 Dámaso Alonso (1898–1990), writer
 Ángel de Andrés (1918–2006), actor and theatre director
 Benito Pérez Galdós (1843–1920), Spanish writer
 Luis Barbero (1916–2005), actor
 Pío Baroja (1872–1956), Spanish writer
 José Bódalo (1916–1985), actor
 Antonia García de Videgain (1850–1924) actress and international singer.
 Julia Caba Alba (1902–1988), actress
 José María Caffarel (1919–1999), actor
 Estrellita Castro (1914–1983), singer, actress
 Salvador Videgain (1886–1947), actor, director, author and producer of theatre.
 Francisco Alonso (1890–1948), composer
 Carmen Sánchez (1898–1985), actress, producer and singer.
 Matilde Muñoz Sampedro (1906–1969) actress
 Antonio Flores (1961–1995), rock musician
 Lola Flores (1923–1995), famous gypsy singer, dancer and actress
 Antonio Garisa (1916–1989), actor
 Irene Gutiérrez Caba (1929–1995), actress
 Jean Laurent (1816–1886)
 Julián Marías (1914–2005), philosopher
 Alfredo Mayo (1911–1985), actor
 José Martín Mena (1935–2006), illustrator
 Antonio Molina (1928–1992), actor
 José Conde Nieves (1911–2006), director
 Juan Carlos Onetti (1909–1994), Uruguayan author
 Luis Peña (1918–1977), actor
 Ángel Picazo (1917–1998), actor
 Emiliano Piedra (1931–1991), film producer
 Mari Carmen Prendes (1906–2002), actress
 Mercedes Prendes (1908–1981), actress
 Federico Romero (1886–1976), poet and librettist
 Santiago Ramón y Cajal (1852–1934), scientist, Nobel prize winner and considered the father of the modern Neuroscience
 Olga Ramos (1918–2005), singer
 Marujita Díaz (1932-2015), singer and actress
 Aurora Redondo (1900–1996), actress
 Fernando Rey (1917–1994), actor
 Evangelina Sobredo Galanes (1948–1976), singer
 Enrique Urquijo (1960–1999), singer
 Frank Yerby (1916–1991), African-American novelist
 José María Alvira (1864–1938), composer
 Laureano López Rodó (1920–2000), Minister of Foreign Affairs during the rule of Francisco Franco.
 Carlos Marín Menchero (1968–2021), singer and producer
 La Chelito (1885–1959), Cuban-born Spanish cuplé singer from the early 20th-century
 Efrén Rebolledo (1877–1929), Mexican poet and diplomat

References 

 Death of Mary Carmen Prendes www.lavozdegalicia.es/hemeroteca/2002/01/27/932867.html

External links 
 
 Our Lady of Almudena from Paths of the Dead
 Cementerio de la Almudena at GoogleMaps

1884 establishments in Spain
1973 disestablishments in Spain
Cemeteries in Madrid
Buildings and structures in Ciudad Lineal District, Madrid
Parks in Madrid